The Hide Your Sheep Tour was a concert tour by hard rock band Van Halen in support of their fifth studio album Diver Down.

Background
When the North American leg for the tour had concluded, the band accepted an offer to perform in South America as they had never performed there. The South American leg was dubbed the "No Problems Tour" when they performed there for a month. After performing in South America, the band concluded the tour with a performance in San Bernardino, performing as a headliner for "Heavy Metal Day" on May 29, 1983 as part of the US Festival alongside headliners Ozzy Osbourne, Judas Priest, Scorpions, Quiet Riot, Triumph and Mötley Crüe. They were reportedly paid $1.5 million for their performance at the US Festival despite the disappointment of the festival's organizers. During this tour, Eddie Van Halen began to use Kramer guitars which had been endorsed in early 1982, notably with a custom double neck. Relations between the members of the band were beginning to hit an all-time low due to the constant partying, which resulted in the band arguing with one another, and creating grudges.

Reception
Pete Bishop from the Pittsburgh Press gave Van Halen's performance a mixed review. He opened by stating that the reader should forget the show for a moment, and note on the aspect of the show being David Lee Roth who Bishop wrote was giving an "obnoxious, disgusting exhibition" which the band did not need. He added about the fan response when they threw things on stage and jumped on stage only to get tossed back off while also noting on problems that happened before the show. When going to the show, he praised the entertainment and the lighting such as the strobe lights at the base of Alex Van Halen's drum platform. Adding to the term 'entertainment', Bishop stated that they were in the best physical rock 'n' roll tradition too - adding the praise to Roth's vocals. He however, criticized that the volume had ruled too often, drowning out Roth's vocals in a muddle of bass and drums, making it almost impossible to recognize songs.

Dave Stuckrath from the Lakeland Ledger gave the performance he attended in Lakeland a poor rating, opening his review by stating that the band was more spectacle than music. He criticized the set as being poorly paced and uneven - only to be saved by their pyrotechnic lighting effects. He also added about the deafening wall of sound which rendered the music and lyrics meaningless than their records. He noted that a Van Halen concert is flashy but was musically and emotionally empty, having to rely on gimmicks and Roth's usage of obscene words and gestures. According to Stuckrath, they did nothing but "degrade rock 'n' roll's past, including that there was nothing original about their music and behavior. He concluded his review, saying that the audience had missed the opening acts which he said were the most entertaining part of the evening. Following the posting of the review, Candy Blank, an attendee from the concert responded to Stuckrath's criticism, stating that the band was one of the best groups around and that the crowd loved every moment instead of being bored in which Stuckrath had claimed, adding that the music was fantastic. They ended their response, adding that the whole article needs a retraction and that Stuckrath should try basing his articles on fact and not prejudice and that he doesn't seem to know anything about good rock and what an audience likes.

Setlist

Songs played overall
"Romeo Delight"
"Unchained"
Alex Van Halen drum solo
"The Full Bug"
"Runnin' with the Devil"
"Jamie's Cryin'"
"Little Guitars"
"Where Have All the Good Times Gone"(The Kinks cover)
Michael Anthony bass solo [and "1984"]
"Hang 'Em High"
"Dancing in the Street"(Martha and the Vandellas cover)
"Beer Drinkers & Hell Raisers" (ZZ Top cover)
"Little Dreamer"
"Mean Street"
"So This Is Love?"
"Cathedral" and "Secrets"
"Everybody Wants Some!!"
"Dance the Night Away"
"Somebody Get Me a Doctor" [and "Girl Gone Bad" (Instrumental band jam), "Woman in Love..." (Intro) and "I'm So Glad" (Cream cover)]
"Summertime Blues" (Eddie Cochran cover)
"Ice Cream Man" (John Brim cover)
"Heartbreak Hotel" (Elvis Presley cover)
"Intruder" and "Oh, Pretty Woman" (Roy Orbison cover)
Eddie Van Halen guitar solo [and "Little Guitars" and "Mean Street" (Intros), "Spanish Fly" and "Eruption"]
"D.O.A."
"79th & Sunset" (Humble Pie cover)
"Ain't Talkin' 'Bout Love"
"Bottoms Up!"
Encore
"Growth" and "You Really Got Me" (The Kinks cover)
"Happy Trails" (Roy Rogers and Dale Evans cover)

Typical set list
"Romeo Delight"
"Unchained"
Alex Van Halen drum solo
"The Full Bug"
"Runnin' with the Devil"
"Jamie's Cryin'"
"Little Guitars"
"Where Have All the Good Times Gone" (The Kinks cover)
"Michael Anthony bass solo" [and "1984"]
"Hang 'Em High"
"Cathedral" and "Secrets"
"Everybody Wants Some!!"
"Dance the Night Away"
"Somebody Get Me a Doctor" [and "I'm So Glad" (Cream cover)]
"Ice Cream Man" (John Brim Cover)
"Intruder"
"Pretty Woman" (Roy Orbison cover)
"Eddie Van Halen guitar solo" ["Little Guitars", "Mean Street" (Intros), "Spanish Fly" and "Eruption"]
"Ain't Talkin' 'Bout Love"
"Bottoms Up!"
Encore:
"Growth" and "You Really Got Me" (The Kinks cover) 
"Happy Trails" (Roy Rogers and Dale Evans cover)

Tour dates

Box office score data

Personnel
 Eddie Van Halen – guitar, backing vocals
 David Lee Roth – lead vocals, acoustic guitar
 Michael Anthony – bass, backing vocals
 Alex Van Halen – drums

References

Citations

General sources

Van Halen concert tours
1982 concert tours
1983 concert tours